Morocco competed at the 2004 Summer Olympics in Athens, Greece, from 13 to 29 August 2004. This was the nation's eleventh appearance at the Olympics, except the 1980 Summer Olympics in Moscow, because of its partial support to the United States boycott.

Comité Olympique Marocain sent a total of 55 athletes, 47 men and 8 women, to compete in 9 sports. Men's football was the only team-based sport in which Morocco had its representation at these Olympic Games. There was only a single competitor in fencing, swimming, and weightlifting. The Moroccan team featured four Olympic medalists from Sydney: boxer Tahar Tamsamani, steeplechaser Ali Ezzine, middle distance runner and top favorite Hicham El Guerrouj, and hurdler and former world champion Nezha Bidouane, who later became the nation's first ever female flag bearer in the opening ceremony.

Morocco left Athens with a total of three Olympic medals (two gold and one silver), being considered the most successful Olympics based on the gold medal count. As one of the major highlights of these Games, Hicham El Guerrouj set an Olympic historical milestone as the first ever Moroccan athlete to strike a distance double (1500–5000) since Paavo Nurmi did so in 1924, and the first to claim a gold since the 1992 Summer Olympics in Barcelona, where Khalid Skah won the men's 10,000 metres title. On August 29, 2004, at the time of the closing ceremony, El Guerrouj was elected to the IOC Athletes' Commission, along with three other athletes. Meanwhile, the silver medal was awarded to fellow middle distance runner Hasna Benhassi in the women's 800 metres.

Medalists

Athletics

Moroccan athletes have so far achieved qualifying standards in the following athletics events (up to a maximum of 3 athletes in each event at the 'A' Standard, and 1 at the 'B' Standard).

Men
Track & road events

Field events

Women
Track & road events

Boxing

Morocco sent seven boxers to Athens. Only two of them won their first bouts, including Sydney bronze medalist Tahar Tamsamani, and both were defeated in the second round to give the team a combined record of 2-7.

Fencing

One Moroccan fencer qualified for the following events:

Men

Football

The Morocco national football team qualified for the Olympics after getting a go-ahead penalty goal in their final qualifying match against Angola.

Men's tournament

Roster

Group play

Judo

Two Moroccan judoka qualified for the 2004 Summer Olympics.

Swimming

Men

Taekwondo

Three Moroccan taekwondo jin qualified for the following events.

Tennis

Morocco nominated two male tennis players to compete in the tournament.

Weightlifting

One Moroccan weightlifter qualified for the following events:

See also
 Morocco at the 2004 Summer Paralympics
 Morocco at the 2005 Mediterranean Games

References

External links
Official Report of the XXVIII Olympiad
Moroccan Olympic Committee 

Nations at the 2004 Summer Olympics
2004
Summer Olympics